Songrim is a city on the Taedong River in North Hwanghae Province, North Korea.  It had a population of 128,831 in 2008.

Administrative divisions
Songrim is divided into 19 tong (neighbourhoods) and 6 ri (villages):

 Chŏn-dong
 Ch'ŏlsan-dong
 Kkotp'in-dong
 Negil-dong
 Oryu-dong
 Saemaŭl-dong
 Saesallim 1-dong
 Saesallim 2-dong
 Saesallim 3-dong
 Saesallim 4-dong
 Samga-dong
 Sap'o 1-dong
 Sap'o 2-dong
 Sinhŭng-dong
 Sŏkt'ap-tong
 Songsan-dong
 Tongsong-dong
 Un'gok-tong
 Wŏlbong-dong
 Masal-li
 Sillyang-ri
 Sinsŏng-ri
 Sŏkt'al-li
 Sŏsong-ri
 Tangsal-li

History

The city was originally named Solme.  Iron works began to be developed during the Japanese colonial period of Korea.  Before Korean independence Songrim was known as Kyŏmip'o.

It was bombed during the Korean War, later it was rebuilt.

Climate
Songrim has a humid continental climate (Köppen climate classification: Dwa).

References

Further reading

Dormels, Rainer. North Korea's Cities: Industrial facilities, internal structures and typification. Jimoondang, 2014.

External links

City profile of Songrim 

Cities in North Hwanghae